The 1929–30 season was the 49th season in the history of Nelson Football Club, and their ninth as a professional club in The Football League. Jack English remained as manager after guiding the team to a 15th-placed finish during the previous campaign. After a poor start to the 1929–30 season, Nelson improved and were seventh in the Third Division North at Christmas. However, in the new year the team faltered and lost 10 of its last 12 matches, thus finishing in 19th position. Nelson ended the season with a record of 13 wins, 7 draws and 22 defeats, giving a total of 33 points. The team was knocked out in the First Round of the FA Cup after losing 0–3 at home to Crewe Alexandra.

Nelson used a total of 29 different players, 5 of whom made just a single appearance during the season. The top goalscorers in the 1929–30 campaign were centre forwards Tom Carmedy and Ernie Dixon, who each netted 10 goals. Fullback Billy Fairhurst made the most appearances for Nelson, missing only two league matches. In the opening four matches of the season, four different goalkeepers were used. Attendances at the club's Seedhill ground were considerably lower than in previous seasons, with an average gate of 3,346, a decrease of more than 30 per cent from 1928–29.

Football League Third Division North

Key
H = Home match
A = Away match
In Result column, Nelson's score shown first

Match results

Final league position

FA Cup

Match results

Player statistics
Key to positions

CF = Centre forward
FB = Fullback
GK = Goalkeeper

HB = Half-back
IF = Inside forward
OF = Outside forward

Statistics

See also
List of Nelson F.C. seasons

References

Nelson F.C. seasons
Nelson